John Luke may refer to:
 John A. Luke Jr., chief executive officer of MeadWestvaco
 John Luke (artist) (1906–1975), Irish artist
 John Luke (New Zealand politician) (1858–1931), New Zealand politician
 John Luke (MP) (1563–1638), English politician who sat in the House of Commons from 1610 to 1611
John Luke (died 1452), MP for Dunwich (UK Parliament constituency)

See also